Euxesta fulvicornis is a species of ulidiid or picture-winged fly in the genus Euxesta of the family Tephritidae. It was described by Jacques-Marie-Frangile Bigot in 1886.

References

fulvicornis
Insects described in 1886
Taxa named by Jacques-Marie-Frangile Bigot